The 1937 Islington North by-election was a parliamentary by-election held on 13 October 1937 for the British House of Commons constituency of Islington North in Islington, North London.

The seat had become vacant when the constituency's Conservative Member of Parliament (MP), Albert Goodman, died on 22 August 1937, aged 57.  He had held the seat since the 1931 general election.

The result of the contest was a victory for the Labour candidate, Leslie Haden-Guest, who won with a majority of 1,296 over the Conservative candidate, former MP Sir Wilfrid Sugden. Haden Guest represented the constituency until he stepped down at the 1950 general election.

The constituency has been held by Labour ever since, save for a brief period in the 1980s when incumbent Labour MP Michael O'Halloran joined the breakaway Social Democratic Party.

See also
Islington North (UK Parliament constituency)
Islington
1958 Islington North by-election
1969 Islington North by-election
List of United Kingdom by-elections

References
 
 

Islington North by-election
Islington North,1937
Islington North by-election
Islington North,1937